Listen Up may refer to:

Music
 Listen Up (album), an album by Hoku, 2008
 Listen Up! (Haley Reinhart album), 2012
 Listen Up! The Official 2010 FIFA World Cup Album
 Listen Up!, an album by Hot Action Cop
 Listen Up!, an album by The Mood Elevator featuring Brendan Benson
 "Listen Up!" (Gossip song), a single by the band the Gossip released in 2006
 "Listen Up", a song by Oasis from "Cigarettes & Alcohol"

Other
 Listen Up! (TV series), a 2004–05 American sitcom
 Listen UP or 4 Guys 1UP, a gaming podcast on the 1UP Radio Network
 Listen Up!, a Canadian arts outreach program established by the Gryphon Trio